The doctrine of lapse was a policy of annexation initiated by the East India Company in the Indian subcontinent about the princely states, and applied until the year 1858, the year after Company rule was succeeded by the British Raj under the British Crown. 

Elements of the doctrine of lapse continued to be applied by the post-independence Indian government to derecognise individual princely families until 1971, when the recognition of former ruling families was discontinued under the 26th amendment to the Indian constitution by the Indira Gandhi government.

Principles
At the time of the formal adoption of the doctrine of lapse, the East India Company had administrative jurisdiction over wide regions of the Indian subcontinent, the Presidencies and provinces of British India, and was responsible for the defence of the princely states.

According to the doctrine, any Indian princely state under the suzerainty of the East India Company, the dominant imperial power in the Indian system of subsidiary alliances, would have its princely status abolished, and therefore be annexed into directly ruled British India, if the ruler was either "manifestly incompetent or died without a male heir". This supplanted the long-established right of an Indian sovereign without an heir to choose a successor. In addition, the Company took upon itself the power to decide whether potential rulers were competent to rule. The doctrine and its applications were widely regarded as illegitimate by many Indians, leading to resentment against the East India Company.

The policy is most commonly associated with Lord Dalhousie, who was the East India Company's Governor General of British India between 1848 and 1856. However, the doctrine was articulated by the Court of Directors of the Company as early as 1834, and several smaller states had already been annexed under this doctrine before Dalhousie took over the post of Governor-General. Dalhousie used the policy most vigorously and extensively, though, so it is generally associated with him.

By the use of the doctrine of lapse, the Company took over the princely states of Satara (1848), Jaitpur, Sambalpur (1849), Baghat (1850), Udaipur (Chhattisgarh State) (1852), Jhansi (1854), Nagpur (1854), Tanjore and Arcot (1855). Awadh (1856) is widely believed to have been annexed under the doctrine, but in fact was annexed by Dalhousie under the pretext of mis-governance. Mostly claiming that the ruler was not ruling properly, the Company added about four million pounds sterling to its annual revenue by this doctrine. However, Udaipur State would later have local princely rule reinstated in 1860.

With the increasing power of the East India Company, discontent simmered among many sections of Indian society, included disbanded soldiers; these rallied behind the deposed dynasties during the Indian Rebellion of 1857, also known as the Sepoy Mutiny.  Following the rebellion, in 1858, the new British Viceroy of India, whose rule replaced that of the East India Company, renounced the doctrine.

Doctrine of lapse before Dalhousie 
Dalhousie vigorously applied the lapse doctrine for annexing Indian princely states, but the policy was not solely his invention.

The princely state of Kittur, ruled by Queen Chennamma, was taken over by the East India Company in 1824, when after the death of her husband and son she adopted a new son and attempted to make him heir to the throne, which the British refused to accept. This development has similarities with the later 'doctrine of lapse', which the Court of Directors of the East India Company articulated early in 1834. As per this policy, the Company annexed Mandvi in 1839, Kolaba, Jalaun in 1840 and Surat in 1842.

The impact of the doctrine of lapse 
The doctrine of lapse was widely considered illegitimate by many Indians. By 1848, the British had immense power in India, since they were the de facto direct rulers of territories such as the Madras, Bombay, and Bengal Presidencies, Assam, Mysore, and the Punjab, as well as the indirect rulers of princely states of Rajasthan, Sind, Patiala, the Carnatic, and many others.

Most of the rulers of the remaining states which had not yet been annexed by the British were in a weak position against their mighty forces. Not willing to spend huge amounts of money and soldiers, the Indian rulers had little option but to give in to this policy. This caused increased resentment against the British Empire in India, and was one of the causes of the Uprising of 1857.

Princely states annexed under the doctrine

In independent India

After the Partition of India and the departure of the British in August 1947, British India became India and Pakistan, and within a year almost all of the rulers of the princely states had been persuaded to sign an instrument of accession to join one or the other. Under the terms of these accessions, the two governments continued to recognize the status of the princely rulers, who at first continued to rule; but later they each sought to integrate the states fully into themselves. The rulers were granted monetary compensation in the form of privy purses, which were annual payments in support of the grantees, their families, and their households.

In 1964, Maharaja Rajendra Prakash of Sirmur, the last recognized former ruler of Sirmur State, died without either leaving male issue or adopting an heir before his death, although his senior widow subsequently adopted her daughter's son as the successor to the family headship. The Indian government, however, decided that in consequence of the ruler's death, the constitutional status of the family had lapsed. The doctrine of lapse was likewise invoked the following year when the last recognized ruler of Akalkot State died in similar circumstances.

See also

Escheat
List of princely states of India
Presidencies and provinces of British India

References 

History of the British Empire
History of India
Legal history of India
Indian Rebellion of 1857
Princely states of India
Annexation